Pollyana Papel (born July 20, 1987 in Bebedouro, São Paulo) is a Brazilian singer, songwriter and actress best known for being a finalist on the first season of Ídolos Brazil (Brazilian Idol).

References

1987 births
Living people
21st-century Brazilian singers